Bagby Furniture Company Building is a historic factory building located at Baltimore, Maryland, United States. It is a four-story, "U"-shaped, brick factory building composed of three sections constructed between 1902 and 1907. Its exterior features segmental and jack arches above openings, a corbeled watertable, and a corbeled cornice.  It housed the Bagby Furniture Company, which operated from 1879 to 1990.

Bagby Furniture Company Building was listed on the National Register of Historic Places in 1998.

References

External links
, including photo from 2001, at Maryland Historical Trust

Buildings and structures in Baltimore
Industrial buildings and structures on the National Register of Historic Places in Baltimore
Industrial buildings completed in 1907
Little Italy, Baltimore